Datuk Willie anak Mongin is a Malaysian politician who has served as the Member of Parliament (MP) for Puncak Borneo since May 2018. He served as the Deputy Minister of Plantation Industries and Commodities II for the second term in the Barisan Nasional (BN) administration under former Prime Minister Ismail Sabri Yaakob and former Minister Zuraida Kamaruddin from August 2021 to the collapse of the BN administration in November 2022 and the first term in the Perikatan Nasional (PN) administration under former Prime Minister Muhyiddin Yassin and former Minister Khairuddin Razali from March 2020 to the collapse of the PN administration in August 2021. He is a member of the Parti Pesaka Bumiputera Bersatu (PBB), a component party of the ruling Gabungan Parti Sarawak (GPS) coalition. He was a member of the Malaysian United Indigenous Party (BERSATU), a component party of the PN coalition and People's Justice Party (PKR), a component party of the Pakatan Harapan (PH) opposition coalition.

Political career

1998 political movement 
In the September 1998, Willie joined a political movement called the Social Justice Movement (Malay: Pergerakan Keadilan Sosial) (ADIL) as Volunteer and Reformist, he joined the movement because he was sympathised with Anwar Ibrahim. Willie only agreed to officially joined PKR in 2009 after being persuaded by few top party leaders.

2011 Sarawak state election 
In the 2011 election, Willie under his party of People's Justice Party (PKR) faced Jerip Susil of the Barisan Nasional and lost in a large majority.

2013 general election 

2016 Sarawak state election 
In the 2016 election, Willie faced Jerip Susil again at Mambong state seat and lost in a large majority.

2018 general election 
In the 2018 election, his party of PKR field him to contest the Puncak Borneo parliamentary seat again, defeating the incumbent candidate Genot Sinel (giving PBB its first defeat in a parliament seat since 1974).

Parliamentary Incident 
In 2018, during the debate on the motion to introduce the Sales and Services Tax (SST), Bung Moktar Radin was recounting the price of goods at markets and Willie uttered ‘Is it not casino, Kinabatangan?’ that was referring to recent photographs that went viral online, purportedly showing a person resembling Bung Moktar sitting at a table in a casino.

Bung Moktar then pointed his finger at Willie and accused Willie of being rude, demanding the statement be retracted and directed his anger at Willie and subsequently shouted "F*ck You".

Election results

Honour 
  :
  Knight Commander of the Order of the Territorial Crown (PMW) – Datuk (2021)

References 

Members of the Dewan Rakyat
People's Justice Party (Malaysia) politicians
Year of birth missing (living people)
Living people
People from Sarawak